Dick Pesonen is a former defensive back in the National Football League. Pesonen first played with the Green Bay Packers during the 1960 NFL season. He was later selected in the 1961 NFL Expansion Draft by the Minnesota Vikings and played that season with the team. From there he played three seasons with the New York Giants.

References

1938 births
Living people
American football defensive backs
Continental Football League coaches
Green Bay Packers players
Minnesota Duluth Bulldogs football players
Minnesota Duluth Bulldogs men's basketball players
Minnesota Vikings players
New York Giants players
People from Grand Rapids, Minnesota
American men's basketball players